Julian Gallagher (born 17 July 1968 in Bromley, London) is a British songwriter and record producer, known for working with Kylie Minogue on her 2001 album, Fever. He also co-wrote songs with Gabrielle on her 2007 album, Always, as well as co-writing many songs for boy band Five, including the chart-topping singles "Keep On Movin'" and "Let's Dance".

Other songs co-written by Gallagher include "Lullaby" for Mel B, and the British chart-topper "What Took You So Long?" for Emma Bunton.

Although mainly a rhythm and lead guitarist, Julian is also proficient on keyboards, bass guitar and drums.  In addition to his own songwriting career, he has worked on many projects with his elder brother, producer and engineer Dillon Gallagher. 

Julian's father is Scottish singer-songwriter Benny Gallagher, of the duo Gallagher and Lyle.

External links
Julian Gallagher's music

Paul Nash, "The Irish Connection", Sound on Sound, December 2001

1968 births
British songwriters
British record producers
Living people
English people of Scottish descent
English people of Irish descent
English multi-instrumentalists
English twins
People from Bromley
Musicians from Kent